Stade Français was an ice hockey team in Paris, France. They were a member of the Stade Français sports association.

History
The ice hockey section of Stade Français was founded in 1931. They won the 1re série four years in a row from 1932-1935. The club was also known as the Rapides de Paris from 1933-1934 and 1937-1940. They folded in 1940.

Achievements
French champion (4): 1932, 1933, 1934, 1935.

References

External links
Team profile on hockeyarenas.net

Ice hockey teams in France